A Lethal Lockdown match is a professional wrestling match used in Total Nonstop Action Wrestling (TNA). This match has become a staple of TNA's Lockdown pay-per-view event, but has also made appearances at other TNA pay-per-views, and during Impact Wrestling TV broadcasts.

Match format
The match consists of a single ring enclosed by a steel cage with two teams facing off with each other. The staggered entry system is identical, to the WarGames match but weapons are permitted and are even provided. When all competitors have entered the ring, a roof is lowered onto the top of the cage, with various weapons hanging from it. Victory can be attained by pinfall or submission.

Matches

References

External links
 TNA Wrestling.com

Professional wrestling match types
2005 in professional wrestling
Impact Wrestling match types
Impact Wrestling Lockdown